Htun Htun Oo (also spelt Tun Tun Oo; born 28 July 1956) is the Chief Justice of the Supreme Court of Myanmar (Burma). He was nominated by President Thein Sein to the post in February 2011. He previously served as Captain in the Southwestern Regional Command of the Myanmar Army from 1981 to 1989, and held the posts of Military Advocate General (1990-1994) and Deputy Chief Justice (2007-2011).

On 31 January 2022, the U.S. Department of the Treasury added Htun Tun Oo to its Specially Designated Nationals (SDN) list.

References

Burmese military personnel
Burmese judges
1956 births
Living people
Chief justices
Specially Designated Nationals and Blocked Persons List
Individuals related to Myanmar sanctions